Lies is a hamlet in the Dutch province of North Brabant. It is located in the municipality of Breda, about 5 km southwest of the city centre.

References

Populated places in North Brabant
Breda